Spalding railway station serves the town of Spalding, Lincolnshire, England. It lies on the Peterborough–Lincoln line.

History

Spalding gained its first rail links to Peterborough, Boston and Lincoln in 1848, courtesy of the Great Northern Railway (GNR) who built their main line from London to Doncaster through the town; Spalding railway station opened on 17 October 1848. This route was superseded by the direct line via Grantham within four years, but it remained well used by traffic heading towards Louth and Grimsby over the former East Lincolnshire Railway.

The GNR subsequently added a line eastwards to Sutton Bridge via Holbeach (the Norwich & Spalding Railway) in stages between 1858 and 1862, a westward route to Bourne in 1866 and another to  the following year in an attempt to thwart the ambitions of the competing Great Eastern Railway (GER).  These efforts did not succeed however and the company eventually agreed to work these routes jointly with the Midland Railway (the former pair forming the backbone of the Midland and Great Northern Joint Railway system) and the GER (March line) by the beginning of the 1870s. The collaboration between GNR and GER also led to the construction of the last route out of the town, the GE&GN Joint line to Sleaford which opened to traffic on 1 August 1882.

By the end of the nineteenth century the town had become a major rail crossroads and the station had grown to reflect this, having more than doubled in size from its opening half a century earlier. It would also later become a popular destination in its own right, with the annual Tulip Festival bringing excursion trains into the town from all over the country from the late 1950s onwards.

British Railways was formed on 1 January 1948, and Spalding station was renamed Spalding Town on 1 December 1948. The Midland & Great Northern routes into the town were heavily used, particularly in the summer months, well into the 1950s, but they were the first to suffer from the BR economy drive of the time, closing to passengers on 28 February 1959. The East Lincolnshire line to Boston was to suffer a similar fate a decade later, with the last trains to Grimsby and Peterborough running on 3 October 1970.  This left the Joint Line as the only surviving route through the town; typically just three trains per day each way between Lincoln and March/Cambridge called at the station in this period.  However, its status as a junction was restored within months, the line to Peterborough regaining a limited (thrice daily, peak hours only) passenger service from 7 June 1971.

The Joint line remained a busy freight artery for the next few years, serving as one as the main outlets for the marshalling yard complex at Whitemoor but the general decline in freight traffic in the area would ultimately lead to the Spalding to March portion's closure to all traffic on 27 November 1982. This left the town effectively with the same rail access as it had back in 1848, albeit with trains to Lincoln running via Sleaford rather than Boston.  Services to and from Peterborough did improve following the closure of the March line, with the existing service from Lincoln diverted to start and terminate there and some extra trains being added to the timetable.

The station, known in steam days as Spalding Town, was honoured on 3 May 2002 when a main line locomotive was dedicated to it. Class 31 diesel No. 31106, owned by Cambridgeshire businessman and enthusiast Howard Johnston, who was born nearby, arrived on a Tulip Parade day special train, and a short stopover was arranged for Colin Fisher, Chairman of South Holland District Council, to unveil the cast Spalding Town nameplate (which includes the authority's crest within it) on the side of the engine. He was also presented with a replica plate as a permanent reminder of the occasion. Although intended for public display, this has not yet taken place.

Station Masters

Mr. Fellowes ???? - 1858
Thomas Blunt ca. 1875 - 1885
James L. Rayner 1885 (afterwards station master at Doncaster)
William Frederick Marsden 1885 - 1891
G.W. Redford 1891 - 1905 (formerly station master at New Barnet)
Walter James Mouncy 1905 - 1916
J.A. Halliday 1916 - 1921 (afterwards station master at Lincoln)
Harry Dennick 1921 - 1925 (afterwards station master at Grantham)
T.H. Greaves 1925 - 1928 (afterwards station master at Northallerton)
Louis B. Perley 1928 - 1937
H.W. Ingham 1937 - 1938
T.W. Croot 1938 - 1954
W. Burns 1954 - ???? (formerly station master at Blaydon)

Facilities
The station is owned by Network Rail and managed by East Midlands Railway who provide all rail services.

The station is staffed part-time and offers limited facilities other than two shelters, bicycle storage, timetables, platform departure screens and Help Points. There is also a ticket machine on platform 1. Other than a snack machine in the booking hall, there are no other retail facilities on the station; however local shops are within walking distance.

As of September 2020, new lifts are in operation allowing step free access to platform 2. A new waiting shelter was opened in March 2022.

Spalding has two platforms. Platform 1, adjacent to the station building, is mainly used for southbound services towards Peterborough and terminating trains from Peterborough, but is also used by some northbound through services towards Sleaford and Lincoln; Platform 2 can only be used by northbound services. There was also, past the Northern Junction a freight line going off to the former British Sugar plant.

The bridge connecting Platforms 1 and 2 to the rest of the station still exists, but the old platform 5 has been fenced off, the bays filled in and the walk through on the bridge to platforms 6 and 7 bricked up. The tracks meanwhile have been lifted, the western island platforms cleared and the site now used for housing.  Though very little remains of the old station, the façade remains as it was when first built.

Only 22 minutes from Peterborough, Spalding railway station is a few minutes away from the bus station connecting Spalding to Boston, King's Lynn and Peterborough.

Services
All services at Spalding are operated by East Midlands Railway.

There is no Sunday service at the station.

References

Body, G. (1986), PSL Field Guides - Railways of the Eastern Region Volume 1, Patrick Stephens Ltd, Wellingborough,

External links

Railway stations in Lincolnshire
DfT Category E stations
Former Great Northern Railway stations
Railway stations in Great Britain opened in 1848
Railway stations served by East Midlands Railway
Spalding, Lincolnshire
Grade II listed buildings in Lincolnshire